"Fashion Killa" is a song by American hip hop recording artist A$AP Rocky. The song was serviced to urban contemporary radio in the United States in November 2013, as the fourth single from his debut studio album Long. Live. A$AP. The song was produced by both Hector Delgado and Rocky himself under the pseudonym LORD FLACKO and Friendzone as the co-producer.

Critical reception
"Fashion Killa" garnered mixed reviews from music critics. Jesal Padania of RapReviews felt the track didn't belong on the album, calling it "a blatantly fawning song for the ladies that doesn't earn its place at the table."
Roman Cooper of HipHopDX called it "a rare misstep as Rocky’s ambitions become a little too plastic and glossy." Alexis Petridis of The Guardian felt that the lyrics and their delivery showed that Rocky "has absolutely nothing to say" about designer clothes. Andrew Nosnitsky of Spin praised the song for calling back to Rocky's mixtape because of how its "angelic vocals skitter brilliantly." Nathan Slavik of DJBooth gave faint praise to "Fashion Killa", saying that its "certainly at least designed to appeal to the ladies."

Music video
The music video for the song premiered on BET's 106 & Park on September 23, 2013. Barbadian recording artist Rihanna is featured throughout the video, while Rocky's fellow ASAP Mob member ASAP Ferg, also makes a cameo appearance. It was the first music video shot by Virgil Abloh.

Use in other media
The song is featured in the 2016 film Zoolander 2, when Derek Zoolander and Hansel McDonald first meet special agent Valentina Valencia. ASAP Rocky himself also makes an appearance during the closing credits of the film.

Track listing
 Digital single

Chart performance

Certifications

References

External links
 

2013 singles
2013 songs
ASAP Rocky songs
RCA Records singles
Kučka songs
Songs written by ASAP Rocky
Songs written by The-Dream
Songs written by Tricky Stewart